Ijazul Ahsan (: born 5 August 1960) has been a Justice of the Supreme Court of Pakistan since 28 June 2016. Earlier to this he was the Chief Justice of the Lahore High Court, Lahore. He was elevated to the Lahore High Court as a judge in 2009 after the lawyer's movement. He remained an associate as a partner in the oldest law firm in Pakistan: Cornelius, Lane & Mufti (CLM).

References

1960 births
Living people
Justices of the Supreme Court of Pakistan
Pakistani judges
Cornell University alumni
Chief Justices of the Lahore High Court
Forman Christian College alumni
Punjab University Law College alumni